Némouthé (or Nemouthé) is a surname. Notable people with the surname include:

 Thomas Némouthé (born 2001), French footballer
 Jean-Renaud Nemouthé (born 1981), French footballer